Santiago Ixtayutla is a town and municipality in Oaxaca in south-western Mexico. 
It is located in the Jamiltepec District in the west of the Costa Region.

As of 2010, the municipality had a total population of 11,917.

References

Municipalities of Oaxaca